Litoria rubrops is a species of frog in the subfamily Pelodryadinae. It is endemic to Papua New Guinea. Its natural habitats are subtropical or tropical moist lowland forests and rivers.

References

Litoria
Amphibians of Papua New Guinea
Amphibians described in 2004
Taxonomy articles created by Polbot